is a passenger railway station in the city of Futtsu, Chiba Prefecture, Japan, operated by the East Japan Railway Company (JR East).

Lines
Aohori Station is served by the Uchibo Line, and is located 43.0 km from the starting point of the line at Soga Station. 43.0 kilometers from the terminus of the Uchibō Line at Soga Station.

Layout
The station consists of a single island platform serving two tracks, connected to the station building by a footbridge. The station is staffed.

Platforms

History
Aohori Station was opened on January 15, 1915 as a station on the Japanese Government Railways (JGR) Kisarazu Line. On May 24, 1919, the line's name changed to the Hōjō Line, and on April 15, 1929, to the Bōsō Line and on April 1, 1933, to the Bōsōnishi Line. It became part of the Japan National Railways (JNR) after World War II, and the line was renamed the Uchibō Line from July 15, 1972. Aohori Station was absorbed into the JR East network upon the privatization of the Japan National Railways (JNR) on April 1, 1987.

Passenger statistics
In fiscal 2019, the station was used by an average of 1473 passengers daily (boarding passengers only).

Surrounding area
 Ino Elementary School

See also
 List of railway stations in Japan

References

External links

 JR East Station information  

Railway stations in Japan opened in 1915
Railway stations in Chiba Prefecture
Uchibō Line
Futtsu